Quantum machine learning is the integration of quantum algorithms within machine learning programs. The most common use of the term refers to machine learning algorithms for the analysis of classical data executed on a quantum computer, i.e. quantum-enhanced machine learning. While machine learning algorithms are used to compute immense quantities of data, quantum machine learning utilizes qubits and quantum operations or specialized quantum systems to improve computational speed and data storage done by algorithms in a program. This includes hybrid methods that involve both classical and quantum processing, where computationally difficult subroutines are outsourced to a quantum device. These routines can be more complex in nature and executed faster on a quantum computer. Furthermore, quantum algorithms can be used to analyze quantum states instead of classical data. Beyond quantum computing, the term "quantum machine learning" is also associated with classical machine learning methods applied to data generated from quantum experiments (i.e. machine learning of quantum systems), such as learning the phase transitions of a quantum system or creating new quantum experiments. Quantum machine learning also extends to a branch of research that explores methodological and structural similarities between certain physical systems and learning systems, in particular neural networks. For example, some mathematical and numerical techniques from quantum physics are applicable to classical deep learning and vice versa. Furthermore, researchers investigate more abstract notions of learning theory with respect to quantum information, sometimes referred to as "quantum learning theory".

Machine learning with quantum computers 
Quantum-enhanced machine learning refers to quantum algorithms that solve tasks in machine learning, thereby improving and often expediting classical machine learning techniques. Such algorithms typically require one to encode the given classical data set into a quantum computer to make it accessible for quantum information processing. Subsequently, quantum information processing routines are applied and the result of the quantum computation is read out by measuring the quantum system. For example, the outcome of the measurement of a qubit reveals the result of a binary classification task. While many proposals of quantum machine learning algorithms are still purely theoretical and require a full-scale universal quantum computer to be tested, others have been implemented on small-scale or special purpose quantum devices.

Linear algebra simulation with quantum amplitudes 

A number of quantum algorithms for machine learning are based on the idea of amplitude encoding, that is, to associate the amplitudes of a quantum state with the inputs and outputs of computations. Since a state of  qubits is described by  complex amplitudes, this information encoding can allow for an exponentially compact representation. Intuitively, this corresponds to associating a discrete probability distribution over binary random variables with a classical vector. The goal of algorithms based on amplitude encoding is to formulate quantum algorithms whose resources grow polynomially in the number of qubits , which amounts to a logarithmic time complexity in the number of amplitudes and thereby the dimension of the input.

Many quantum machine learning algorithms in this category are based on variations of the quantum algorithm for linear systems of equations (colloquially called HHL, after the paper's authors) which, under specific conditions, performs a matrix inversion using an amount of physical resources growing only logarithmically in the dimensions of the matrix. One of these conditions is that a Hamiltonian which entry wise corresponds to the matrix can be simulated efficiently, which is known to be possible if the matrix is sparse or low rank. For reference, any known classical algorithm for matrix inversion requires a number of operations that grows more than quadratically in the dimension of the matrix (e.g. ), but they are not restricted to sparse matrices.

Quantum matrix inversion can be applied to machine learning methods in which the training reduces to solving a linear system of equations, for example in least-squares linear regression, the least-squares version of support vector machines, and Gaussian processes.

A crucial bottleneck of methods that simulate linear algebra computations with the amplitudes of quantum states is state preparation, which often requires one to initialise a quantum system in a state whose amplitudes reflect the features of the entire dataset. Although efficient methods for state preparation are known for specific cases, this step easily hides the complexity of the task.

Variational quantum algorithms (VQAs) 
VQAs are one of the most studied quantum algorithms as researchers expect that all the needed applications for the quantum computer will be using the VQAs and also VQAs seem to fulfill the expectation for gaining quantum supremacy.  VQAs is a mixed quantum-classical approach where the quantum processor prepares quantum states and measurement is made and the optimization is done by a classical computer. VQAs are considered best for NISQ as VQAs are noise tolerant compared to other algorithms and give quantum superiority with only a few hundred qubits. Researchers have studied circuit-based algorithms to solve optimization problems and find the ground state energy of complex systems, which were difficult to solve or required a large time to perform the computation using a classical computer.

Variational quantum circuits (VQCs) 
Variational Quantum Circuits also known as Parametrized Quantum Circuits (PQCs) are based on Variational Quantum Algorithms (VQAs). VQCs consist of three parts, preparation of initial states, quantum circuit and measurement. Researchers are extensively studying VQCs, as it uses the power of quantum computation to learn in a short time and also use fewer parameters than its classical counterparts. It is theoretically and numerically proven that we can approximate non-linear functions, like those used in neural networks, on quantum circuits. Due to VQCs superiority, neural network has been replaced by VQCs in Reinforcement Learning tasks and Generative Algorithms. The intrinsic nature of quantum devices towards decoherence, random gate error and measurement errors caused to have high potential to limit the training of the variation circuits. Training the VQCs on the classical devices before employing them on quantum devices helps to overcome the problem of decoherence noise that came through the number of repetitions for training.

Quantum binary classifier 
Pattern reorganization is one of the important task of machine learning, binary classification is one of the tool or algorithms to find pattern. Binary classification is used in supervised learning and in unsupervised learning. In quantum machine learning, classical bits are converted in qubits and they are map to Hilbert space, complex value data are used in quantum binary classifier to used the advantage of Hilbert space. By exploiting, the quantum mechanic properties such as superposition, entanglement, interference the quantum binary classifier produces the accurate result in short period of time.

Quantum machine learning algorithms based on Grover search 
Another approach to improving classical machine learning with quantum information processing uses amplitude amplification methods based on Grover's search algorithm, which has been shown to solve unstructured search problems with a quadratic speedup compared to classical algorithms. These quantum routines can be employed for learning algorithms that translate into an unstructured search task, as can be done, for instance, in the case of the k-medians and the k-nearest neighbors algorithms. Another application is a quadratic speedup in the training of perceptron.

An example of amplitude amplification being used in a machine learning algorithm is Grover's search algorithm minimization. In which a subroutine uses Grover's search algorithm to find an element less than some previously defined element. This can be done with an oracle that determines whether or not a state with a corresponding element is less than the predefined one. Grover's algorithm can then find an element such that our condition is met. The minimization is initialized by some random element in our data set, and iteratively does this subroutine to find the minimum element in the data set.

Amplitude amplification is often combined with quantum walks to achieve the same quadratic speedup. Quantum walks have been proposed to enhance Google's PageRank algorithm as well as the performance of reinforcement learning agents in the projective simulation framework.

Quantum-enhanced reinforcement learning 
Reinforcement learning is a branch of machine learning distinct from supervised and unsupervised learning, which also admits quantum enhancements. In quantum-enhanced reinforcement learning, a quantum agent interacts with a classical or quantum environment and occasionally receives rewards for its actions, which allows the agent to adapt its behavior—in other words, to learn what to do in order to gain more rewards. In some situations, either because of the quantum processing capability of the agent, or due to the possibility to probe the environment in superpositions, a quantum speedup may be achieved. Implementations of these kinds of protocols have been proposed for systems of trapped ions and superconducting circuits. A quantum speedup of the agent's internal decision-making time has been experimentally demonstrated in trapped ions, while a quantum speedup of the learning time in a fully coherent (`quantum') interaction between agent and environment has been experimentally realized in a photonic setup.

Quantum annealing 

Quantum annealing is an optimization technique used to determine the local minima and maxima of a function over a given set of candidate functions. This is a method of discretizing a function with many local minima or maxima in order to determine the observables of the function. The process can be distinguished from Simulated annealing by the Quantum tunneling process, by which particles tunnel through kinetic or potential barriers from a high state to a low state. Quantum annealing starts from a superposition of all possible states of a system, weighted equally. Then the time-dependent Schrödinger equation guides the time evolution of the system, serving to affect the amplitude of each state as time increases. Eventually, the ground state can be reached to yield the instantaneous Hamiltonian of the system.

NISQ Circuit as Quantum Model 
As the depth of the quantum circuit advances on NISQ devices, the noise level rises, posing a significant challenge to accurately computing costs and gradients on training models. The noise tolerance will be improved by using the quantum perceptron and the quantum algorithm on the currently accessible quantum hardware.

A regular connection of similar components known as neurons forms the basis of even the most complex brain networks. Typically, a neuron has two operations: the inner product and an activation function. As opposed to the activation function, which is typically nonlinear, the inner product is a linear process. With quantum computing, linear processes may be easily accomplished additionally,  due to the simplicity of implementation, the threshold function is preferred by the majority of quantum neurons for activation functions.

Quantum Binary Classifier 
Pattern reorganization is one of the important task of machine learning, binary classification is one of the tool or algorithms to find pattern. Binary classification is used in supervised learning and in unsupervised learning. In quantum machine learning, classical bits are converted in qubits and they are map to Hilbert space, complex value data are used in quantum binary classifier to used the advantage of Hilbert space. By exploiting, the quantum mechanic properties such as superposition, entanglement, interference the quantum binary classifier produces the accurate result in short period of time.

Quantum sampling techniques 
Sampling from high-dimensional probability distributions is at the core of a wide spectrum of computational techniques with important applications across science, engineering, and society. Examples include deep learning, probabilistic programming, and other machine learning and artificial intelligence applications.

A computationally hard problem, which is key for some relevant machine learning tasks, is the estimation of averages over probabilistic models defined in terms of a Boltzmann distribution. Sampling from generic probabilistic models is hard: algorithms relying heavily on sampling are expected to remain intractable no matter how large and powerful classical computing resources become. Even though quantum annealers, like those produced by D-Wave Systems, were designed for challenging combinatorial optimization problems, it has been recently recognized as a potential candidate to speed up computations that rely on sampling by exploiting quantum effects.

Some research groups have recently explored the use of quantum annealing hardware for training Boltzmann machines and deep neural networks. The standard approach to training Boltzmann machines relies on the computation of certain averages that can be estimated by standard sampling techniques, such as Markov chain Monte Carlo algorithms. Another possibility is to rely on a physical process, like quantum annealing, that naturally generates samples from a Boltzmann distribution. The objective is to find the optimal control parameters that best represent the empirical distribution of a given dataset.

The D-Wave 2X system hosted at NASA Ames Research Center has been recently used for the learning of a special class of restricted Boltzmann machines that can serve as a building block for deep learning architectures. Complementary work that appeared roughly simultaneously showed that quantum annealing can be used for supervised learning in classification tasks. The same device was later used to train a fully connected Boltzmann machine to generate, reconstruct, and classify down-scaled, low-resolution handwritten digits, among other synthetic datasets. In both cases, the models trained by quantum annealing had a similar or better performance in terms of quality. The ultimate question that drives this endeavour is whether there is quantum speedup in sampling applications. Experience with the use of quantum annealers for combinatorial optimization suggests the answer is not straightforward. Reverse annealing has been used as well to solve a fully connected quantum restricted Boltzmann machine.

Inspired by the success of Boltzmann machines based on classical Boltzmann distribution, a new machine learning approach based on quantum Boltzmann distribution of a transverse-field Ising Hamiltonian was recently proposed. Due to the non-commutative nature of quantum mechanics, the training process of the quantum Boltzmann machine can become nontrivial. This problem was, to some extent, circumvented by introducing bounds on the quantum probabilities, allowing the authors to train the model efficiently by sampling. It is possible that a specific type of quantum Boltzmann machine has been trained in the D-Wave 2X by using a learning rule analogous to that of classical Boltzmann machines.

Quantum annealing is not the only technology for sampling. In a prepare-and-measure scenario, a universal quantum computer prepares a thermal state, which is then sampled by measurements. This can reduce the time required to train a deep restricted Boltzmann machine, and provide a richer and more comprehensive framework for deep learning than classical computing. The same quantum methods also permit efficient training of full Boltzmann machines and multi-layer, fully connected models and do not have well-known classical counterparts. Relying on an efficient thermal state preparation protocol starting from an arbitrary state, quantum-enhanced Markov logic networks exploit the symmetries and the locality structure of the probabilistic graphical model generated by a first-order logic template. This provides an exponential reduction in computational complexity in probabilistic inference, and, while the protocol relies on a universal quantum computer, under mild assumptions it can be embedded on contemporary quantum annealing hardware.

Quantum neural networks 

Quantum analogues or generalizations of classical neural nets are often referred to as quantum neural networks. The term is claimed by a wide range of approaches, including the implementation and extension of neural networks using photons, layered variational circuits or quantum Ising-type models. Quantum neural networks are often defined as an expansion on Deutsch's model of a quantum computational network. Within this model, nonlinear and irreversible gates, dissimilar to the Hamiltonian operator, are deployed to speculate the given data set. Such gates make certain phases unable to be observed and generate specific oscillations. Quantum neural networks apply the principals quantum information and quantum computation to classical neurocomputing. Current research shows that QNN can exponentially increase the amount of computing power and the degrees of freedom for a computer, which is limited for a classical computer to its size. A quantum neural network has computational capabilities to decrease the number of steps, qubits used, and computation time. The wave function to quantum mechanics is the neuron for Neural networks. To test quantum applications in a neural network, quantum dot molecules are deposited on a substrate of GaAs or similar to record how they communicate with one another. Each quantum dot can be referred as an island of electric activity, and when such dots are close enough (approximately 10 - 20 nm) electrons can tunnel underneath the islands. An even distribution across the substrate in sets of two create dipoles and ultimately two spin states, up or down.

Quantum Convolution Neural Network

A novel design for multi-dimensional vectors that uses circuits as convolution filters is QCNN. It was inspired by the advantages of CNNs and the power of QML. It is made using a combination of a variational quantum circuit(VQC) and a deep neural network(DNN), fully utilizing the power of extremely parallel processing on a superposition of a quantum state with a finite number of qubits. The main strategy is to carry out an iterative optimization process in the NISQ devices, without the negative impact of noise, which is possibly incorporated into the circuit parameter, and without the need for quantum error correction.

The quantum circuit must effectively handle spatial information in order for QCNN to function as CNN. The convolution filter is the most basic technique for making use of spatial information. One or more quantum convolutional filters make up a quantum convolutional neural network (QCNN), and each of these filters transforms input data using a quantum circuit that can be created in an organized or randomized way. Three parts  that make up the quantum convolutional filter are:  the encoder, the parameterized quantum circuit (PQC), and the measurement. The quantum convolutional filter can be seen as an extension of the filter in the traditional CNN because it was designed with trainable parameters.

Quantum neural networks take advantage of the hierarchical structures, and for each subsequent layer, the number of qubits from the preceding layer is decreased by a factor of two. For n input qubits, these structure have O(log(n)) layers, allowing for shallow circuit depth. Additionally, they are able to avoid "barren plateau," one of the most significant issues with PQC-based algorithms, ensuring trainability. Despite the fact that the QCNN model does not include the corresponding quantum operation, the fundamental idea of the pooling layer is also offered to assure validity. In QCNN architecture, the pooling layer is typically placed between succeeding convolutional layers. Its function is to shrink the representation's spatial size while preserving crucial features, which allows it to reduce the number of parameters, streamline network computing, and manage over-fitting.  Such process can be accomplished applying full Tomography on the state to reduce it all the way down to one qubit and then processed it in subway. The most frequently used unit type in the pooling layer is max pooling, although there are other types as well. Similar to conventional feed-forward neural networks, the last module is a fully connected layer with full connections to all activations in the preceding layer. Translational invariance, which requires identical blocks of parameterized quantum gates within a layer, is a distinctive feature of the QCNN architecture.

Dissipative Quantum Neural Network 
Dissipative QNNs (DQNNs) are constructed from layers of qubits coupled by perceptron called building blocks, which have an arbitrary unitary design. Each node in the network layer of a DQNN is given a distinct collection of qubits, and each qubit is also given a unique quantum perceptron unitary to characterize it. The input states information are transported through the network in a feed-forward fashion, layer-to-layer transition mapping on the qubits of the two adjacent layers, as the name implies. Dissipative term also refers to the fact that the output layer is formed by the ancillary qubits while the input layers are dropped while tracing out the final layer. When performing a broad supervised learning task, DQNN are used to learn a unitary matrix connecting the input and output quantum states. The training data for this task consists of the quantum state and the corresponding classical labels.

Inspired by the extremely successful classical Generative adversarial network(GAN), dissipative quantum generative adversarial network (DQGAN) is introduced for unsupervised learning of the unlabeled training data . The generator and the discriminator are the two DQNNs that make up a single DQGAN. The generator's goal is to create false training states that the discriminator cannot differentiate from the genuine ones, while the discriminator's objective is to separate the real training states from the fake states created by the generator. The relevant features of the training set are learned by the generator by alternate and adversarial training of the networks that aid in the production of sets that extend the training set. DQGAN has a fully quantum architecture and is trained in quantum data.

Hidden quantum Markov models 
Hidden quantum Markov models (HQMMs) are a quantum-enhanced version of classical Hidden Markov Models (HMMs), which are typically used to model sequential data in various fields like robotics and natural language processing. Unlike the approach taken by other quantum-enhanced machine learning algorithms, HQMMs can be viewed as models inspired by quantum mechanics that can be run on classical computers as well. Where classical HMMs use probability vectors to represent hidden 'belief' states, HQMMs use the quantum analogue: density matrices. Recent work has shown that these models can be successfully learned by maximizing the log-likelihood of the given data via classical optimization, and there is some empirical evidence that these models can better model sequential data compared to classical HMMs in practice, although further work is needed to determine exactly when and how these benefits are derived. Additionally, since classical HMMs are a particular kind of Bayes net, an exciting aspect of HQMMs is that the techniques used show how we can perform quantum-analogous Bayesian inference, which should allow for the general construction of the quantum versions of probabilistic graphical models.

Fully quantum machine learning 
In the most general case of quantum machine learning, both the learning device and the system under study, as well as their interaction, are fully quantum. This section gives a few examples of results on this topic.

One class of problem that can benefit from the fully quantum approach is that of 'learning' unknown quantum states, processes or measurements, in the sense that one can subsequently reproduce them on another quantum system. For example, one may wish to learn a measurement that discriminates between two coherent states, given not a classical description of the states to be discriminated, but instead a set of example quantum systems prepared in these states. The naive approach would be to first extract a classical description of the states and then implement an ideal discriminating measurement based on this information. This would only require classical learning. However, one can show that a fully quantum approach is strictly superior in this case. (This also relates to work on quantum pattern matching.) The problem of learning unitary transformations can be approached in a similar way.

Going beyond the specific problem of learning states and transformations, the task of clustering also admits a fully quantum version, wherein both the oracle which returns the distance between data-points and the information processing device which runs the algorithm are quantum. Finally, a general framework spanning supervised, unsupervised and reinforcement learning in the fully quantum setting was introduced in, where it was also shown that the possibility of probing the environment in superpositions permits a quantum speedup in reinforcement learning. Such a speedup in the reinforcement-learning paradigm has been experimentally demonstrated in a photonic setup.

Explainable quantum machine learning 
The need for models that can be understood by humans emerges in quantum machine learning in analogy to classical machine learning and drives the research field of explainable quantum machine learning (or XQML in analogy to XAI/XML). XQML can be considered as an alternative research direction instead of finding a quantum advantage. For example, XQML has been used in the context of mobile malware detection and classification. Quantum Shapley values have also been proposed to interpret gates within a circuit based on a game-theoretic approach. For this purpose, gates instead of features act as players in a coalitional game with a value function that depends on measurements of the quantum circuit of interest.

Classical learning applied to quantum problems 

The term "quantum machine learning" sometimes refers to classical machine learning performed on data from quantum systems. A basic example of this is quantum state tomography, where a quantum state is learned from measurement. Other applications include learning Hamiltonians and automatically generating quantum experiments.

Quantum learning theory 
Quantum learning theory pursues a mathematical analysis of the quantum generalizations of classical learning models and of the possible speed-ups or other improvements that they may provide. The framework is very similar to that of classical computational learning theory, but the learner in this case is a quantum information processing device, while the data may be either classical or quantum. Quantum learning theory should be contrasted with the quantum-enhanced machine learning discussed above, where the goal was to consider specific problems and to use quantum protocols to improve the time complexity of classical algorithms for these problems. Although quantum learning theory is still under development, partial results in this direction have been obtained.

The starting point in learning theory is typically a concept class, a set of possible concepts. For example, the concept class could be the set of disjunctive normal form (DNF) formulas on n bits or the set of Boolean circuits of some constant depth. The goal for the learner is to learn (exactly or approximately) an unknown target concept from this concept class. The learner may be actively interacting with the target concept, or passively receiving samples from it.

In active learning, a learner can make membership queries to the target concept c, asking for its value c(x) on inputs x chosen by the learner. The learner then has to reconstruct the exact target concept, with high probability. In the model of quantum exact learning, the learner can make membership queries in quantum superposition. If the complexity of the learner is measured by the number of membership queries it makes, then quantum exact learners can be polynomially more efficient than classical learners for some concept classes, but not more. If complexity is measured by the amount of time the learner uses, then there are concept classes that can be learned efficiently by quantum learners but not by classical learners (under plausible complexity-theoretic assumptions).

A natural model of passive learning is Valiant's probably approximately correct (PAC) learning. Here the learner receives random examples (x,c(x)), where x is distributed according to some unknown distribution D. The learner's goal is to output a hypothesis function h such that h(x)=c(x) with high probability when x is drawn according to D. The learner has to be able to produce such an 'approximately correct' h for every D and every target concept c in its concept class. We can consider replacing the random examples by potentially more powerful quantum examples . In the PAC model (and the related agnostic model), this doesn't significantly reduce the number of examples needed: for every concept class, classical and quantum sample complexity are the same up to constant factors. However, for learning under some fixed distribution D, quantum examples can be very helpful, for example for learning DNF under the uniform distribution. When considering time complexity, there exist concept classes that can be PAC-learned efficiently by quantum learners, even from classical examples, but not by classical learners (again, under plausible complexity-theoretic assumptions).

This passive learning type is also the most common scheme in supervised learning: a learning algorithm typically takes the training examples fixed, without the ability to query the label of unlabelled examples. Outputting a hypothesis h is a step of induction. Classically, an inductive model splits into a training and an application phase: the model parameters are estimated in the training phase, and the learned model is applied an arbitrary many times in the application phase. In the asymptotic limit of the number of applications, this splitting of phases is also present with quantum resources.

Implementations and experiments 

The earliest experiments were conducted using the adiabatic D-Wave quantum computer, for instance, to detect cars in digital images using regularized boosting with a nonconvex objective function in a demonstration in 2009. Many experiments followed on the same architecture, and leading tech companies have shown interest in the potential of quantum machine learning for future technological implementations. In 2013, Google Research, NASA, and the Universities Space Research Association launched the Quantum Artificial Intelligence Lab which explores the use of the adiabatic D-Wave quantum computer. A more recent example trained a probabilistic generative models with arbitrary pairwise connectivity, showing that their model is capable of generating handwritten digits as well as reconstructing noisy images of bars and stripes and handwritten digits.

Using a different annealing technology based on nuclear magnetic resonance (NMR), a quantum Hopfield network was implemented in 2009 that mapped the input data and memorized data to Hamiltonians, allowing the use of adiabatic quantum computation. NMR technology also enables universal quantum computing, and it was used for the first experimental implementation of a quantum support vector machine to distinguish hand written number ‘6’ and ‘9’ on a liquid-state  quantum computer in 2015. The training data involved the pre-processing of the image which maps them to normalized 2-dimensional vectors to represent the images as the states of a qubit. The two entries of the vector are the vertical and horizontal ratio of the pixel intensity of the image. Once the vectors are defined on the feature space, the quantum support vector machine was implemented to classify the unknown input vector. The readout avoids costly quantum tomography by reading out the final state in terms of direction (up/down) of the NMR signal.

Photonic implementations are attracting more attention, not the least because they do not require extensive cooling. Simultaneous spoken digit and speaker recognition and chaotic time-series prediction were demonstrated at data rates beyond 1 gigabyte per second in 2013. Using non-linear photonics to implement an all-optical linear classifier, a perceptron model was capable of learning the classification boundary iteratively from training data through a feedback rule. A core building block in many learning algorithms is to calculate the distance between two vectors: this was first experimentally demonstrated for up to eight dimensions using entangled qubits in a photonic quantum computer in 2015.

Recently, based on a neuromimetic approach, a novel ingredient has been added to the field of quantum machine learning, in the form of a so-called quantum memristor, a quantized model of the standard classical memristor. This device can be constructed by means of a tunable resistor, weak measurements on the system, and a classical feed-forward mechanism. An implementation of a quantum memristor in superconducting circuits has been proposed, and an experiment with quantum dots performed. A quantum memristor would implement nonlinear interactions in the quantum dynamics which would aid the search for a fully functional quantum neural network.

Since 2016, IBM has launched an online cloud-based platform for quantum software developers, called the IBM Q Experience. This platform consists of several fully operational quantum processors accessible via the IBM Web API. In doing so, the company is encouraging software developers to pursue new algorithms through a development environment with quantum capabilities. New architectures are being explored on an experimental basis, up to 32 qubits, utilizing both trapped-ion and superconductive quantum computing methods.

In October 2019, it was noted that the introduction of Quantum Random Number Generators (QRNGs) to machine learning models including Neural Networks and Convolutional Neural Networks for random initial weight distribution and Random Forests for splitting processes had a profound effect on their ability when compared to the classical method of Pseudorandom Number Generators (PRNGs). However, in a more recent publication from 2021, these claims could not be reproduced for Neural Network weight initialization and no significant advantage of using QRNGs over PRNGs was found. The work also demonstrated that the generation of fair random numbers with a gate quantum computer is a non-trivial task on NISQ devices, and QRNGs are therefore typically much more difficult to utilize in practice than PRNGs.

A paper published in December 2018 reported on an experiment using a trapped-ion system demonstrating a quantum speedup of the deliberation time of reinforcement learning agents employing internal quantum hardware.

In March 2021, a team of researchers from Austria, The Netherlands, the USA and Germany reported the experimental demonstration of a quantum speedup of the learning time of reinforcement learning agents interacting fully quantumly with the environment. The relevant degrees of freedom of both agent and environment were realized on a compact and fully tunable integrated nanophotonic processor.

Skepticism

While machine learning itself is now not only a research field but an economically significant and fast growing industry and quantum computing is a well established field of both theoretical and experimental research, quantum machine learning remains a purely theoretical field of studies. Attempts to experimentally demonstrate concepts of quantum machine learning remain insufficient.

Many of the leading scientists that extensively publish in the field of quantum machine learning warn about the extensive hype around the topic and are very restrained if asked about its practical uses in the foreseeable future. Sophia Chen collected some of the statements made by well known scientists in the field:

 "I think we haven't done our homework yet. This is an extremely new scientific field," - physicist Maria Schuld of Canada-based quantum computing startup Xanadu.
 “When mixing machine learning with ‘quantum,’ you catalyse a hype-condensate.” - Jacob Biamonte a contributor to the theory of quantum computation.
 "There is a lot more work that needs to be done before claiming quantum machine learning will actually work," - computer scientist Iordanis Kerenidis, the head of quantum algorithms at the Silicon Valley-based quantum computing startup QC Ware.
 "I have not seen a single piece of evidence that there exists a meaningful [machine learning] task for which it would make sense to use a quantum computer and not a classical computer," - physicist Ryan Sweke of the Free University of Berlin in Germany.
 “Don't fall for the hype!” -  Frank Zickert, who is the author of probably the most practical book related to the subject beware that ”quantum computers are far away from advancing machine learning for their representation ability”, and even speaking about evaluation and optimization for any kind of useful task quantum supremacy is not yet achieved. Furthermore, nobody among the active researchers in the field make any forecasts about when it could possibly become practical.

See also 
Differentiable programming
Quantum computing
Quantum algorithm for linear systems of equations
Quantum annealing
Quantum neural network
Quantum image

References 

Machine learning
Quantum information science
Theoretical computer science
Emerging technologies
Quantum programming